Castle Rock is a barren, uninhabited island located in Nahant Bay in Nahant, Massachusetts.

References

Islands of Essex County, Massachusetts
Nahant, Massachusetts
Uninhabited islands of Massachusetts
Islands of Massachusetts
Coastal islands of Massachusetts